David Hart Weeks (born December 21, 1960) is an American politician, retired U.S. Navy Captain, and businessman who will serve in the Vermont Senate from Rutland. A Republican, Weeks was elected to the Vermont Senate in 2022, as one of three at-large senators representing the Rutland County Senate district.

Early life and education 
The youngest of five, Weeks was born on December 21, 1960, in Hartford, Connecticut, the son of Gerry and Robert H. Weeks. His father was a U.S. Navy Captain, and businessman who served two terms in the Vermont House of Representatives from Wallingford. David graduated from Mill River Union High School in 1979, and is a 1984 graduate of the University of Vermont, where he received a Bachelor of Arts degree in Computer Science. He later received a MBA in Project Management from University of San Diego in 2005 as a Teplitz fellow, a Master of Strategic Studies from the Army War College in 2007 and a Master of Public Administration from Villanova University in 2022.

Military career 
Weeks first enlisted in the U.S. Marines as part of the University of Vermont's ROTC program. After graduation, he joined the U.S. Navy where his service included serving as the Chief Engineer on the USS Mobile Bay. In 1997 he joined the United States Navy Reserve. In the wake of the September 11 attacks, he was deployed three times, including to the Iraq/Kuwait border, where he took part in the 2003 invasion of Iraq. He retired from the U.S. Navy in 2013 as a Captain.

Business career 
Weeks transitioned from the active duty Navy in 1997 to pursue a career in business. He has held various high-level program management positions in the defense and security sectors within the United States, Europe, East Asia, and Middle East. He specialized in leading commercial high-tech, internationally sensitive projects valued in the billions.

Political career 
Weeks was elected to the Vermont Senate in 2022, as one of three at-large senators representing the Rutland County Senate district. He ran on an economic platform focusing on infrastructure and business development.

He is a member of the Senate Education Committee and serves as the Vice Chair of the Senate Health and Welfare Committee.

Personal life 
Weeks lives in Proctor, Vermont with his wife, Leeanne Wootten. He has two adult children, Jacob and Sarah Weeks.

References

1960 births
Living people
United States Navy officers
21st-century American businesspeople
Businesspeople from Vermont
21st-century American politicians
University of Vermont alumni
University of San Diego alumni
People from Proctor, Vermont
People from Wallingford, Vermont
Republican Party Vermont state senators